The M/V Islander was a -long ferry formerly operated by the Steamship Authority (SSA).

Career

It was built in 1950 by Maryland Drydock Company and was a ferry for the Woods Hole, Martha's Vineyard and Nantucket Steamship Authority, primarily on the Martha's Vineyard run, until March 5, 2007, when it was replaced with the new M/V Island Home, a new ferry which is both larger and faster than the "Islander". The Islander at its peak was able to transport over 700 passengers and 85 vehicles.

In 1975 M/V Islander was featured in the movie “Jaws.”

Initially expected to be sold for scrap, the M/V Islander was saved in 2007 when the State of New York made a late $500,000 bid to purchase the vessel for the Governors Island Preservation and Education Corporation (GIPEC) to provide additional ferry service between Manhattan and Governors Island. In an ironic note, one of the current SSA ferries, M/V Governor was formerly in the same service, operated by the U.S. Coast Guard to serve its Governors Island base until 1996 when the base closed and the ferry declared surplus.  

Following a more complete survey GIPEC determined that the ferry had hull damage from running aground and significant deferred maintenance, requiring $6,000,000 in repairs to retain its Coast Guard passenger certification.  In February 2009, unable to sell the ferry through New York state property disposal process, the Islander was put up for sale on eBay and sold to a speculator and scrap merchant Don Slovak from Kinderhook, New York for the winning bid of $23,600.   

In August 2009, Slovak sought breach of contract by stating the state's refusal to issue a bill of sale wrecked his chance to sell it, suffering $171,400 in lost profits. Slovak contended that state officials wanted him to sign a "docking agreement." State officials wanted Slovak to assume full liability for, and insure the vessel before tendering a bill of sale and allowing it to be moved. 

In 2010, the ferry was purchased by Donjon Marine Company of New Jersey, and moved to Port Newark for eventual scrapping.

References

External links

Ferries of Massachusetts
1950 ships
Martha's Vineyard
Ships built in Baltimore